Cyperus stolonifer is a species of sedge that is native to parts of Asia, northern Australia and Madagascar.

See also 
 List of Cyperus species

References 

stolonifer
Plants described in 1786
Flora of Queensland
Flora of the Northern Territory
Flora of Madagascar
Flora of India
Flora of China
Flora of Bangladesh
Flora of Cambodia
Flora of Laos
Flora of Malaysia
Flora of Mauritius
Flora of Myanmar
Flora of New Guinea
Flora of Pakistan
Flora of the Philippines
Flora of Samoa
Flora of Sri Lanka
Flora of Taiwan
Flora of Thailand
Flora of Vietnam
Taxa named by Anders Jahan Retzius